Domestic product may refer to:

Gross domestic product, the total value of all the goods and services produced inside a nation over a certain period.
Net domestic product, the gross domestic product minus depreciation on a country's capital goods.

fr:Production domestique